Restless Night is a 1958 West German war drama film directed by Falk Harnack and starring Bernhard Wicki, Ulla Jacobsson and Hansjörg Felmy. It is set on the Eastern Front during the Second World War. It was partly shot at the Wandsbek Studios in Hamburg. The film's sets were designed by the art directors Franz Bi and Bruno Monden.

Cast
 Bernhard Wicki as Priest Brunner
 Ulla Jacobsson as Melanie
 Hansjörg Felmy as Fedor Baranowski
 Anneli Sauli as Ljuba
 Erik Schumann as Hauptmann von Arnim
 Werner Hinz as Oberleutnant Ernst
 Richard Münch as Kriegsgerichtsrat
 Werner Peters as Major Kartuschke
 Paul Esser as Zahlmeister
 Willem Holsboer
 Joseph Offenbach as Untersuchungsrichter
 Emmerich Schrenk
 Benno Gellenbeck
 Werner Völger
 Wolfgang Gruner
 Erik von Loewis
 Albert Bessler
 Otto Friebel
 Manfred Meurer

See also
Arrow to the Heart (TV play, 1952)

References

Bibliography 
 Parish, Robert. Film Actors Guide. Scarecrow Press, 1977.

External links 
 

1958 films
West German films
German war drama films
1950s war drama films
1950s German-language films
Films directed by Falk Harnack
Eastern Front of World War II films
Anti-war films about World War II
Films about Christianity
Real Film films
Films shot at Wandsbek Studios
1958 drama films
1950s German films